Thomas Holmén Sopp (born 15 September 1971)   is a Norwegian backstroke and freestyle swimmer. He was born in Sandefjord. He competed at the 1992 Summer Olympics in Barcelona. He won a total of thirteen gold medals at the Norwegian championships.

References

External links

1971 births
Living people
People from Sandefjord
Norwegian male backstroke swimmers
Norwegian male freestyle swimmers
Olympic swimmers of Norway
Swimmers at the 1992 Summer Olympics
Sportspeople from Vestfold og Telemark
20th-century Norwegian people